"Walk Me Home" is a song by singer Mandy Moore from her debut album, So Real (1999), and released as the album's second single in 1999. The song was featured in the film Center Stage and on the reissue of So Real, I Wanna Be with You (2000). It was written and produced by Anthony Moran. Chuck Taylor from Billboard provided a positive review of the song, describing it as "the best song Janet Jackson never recorded."

The single did not achieve the same success as "Candy" and failed to reach the Billboard Hot 100. However, it peaked at number 38 on the Billboard Mainstream Top 40 chart following its re-release in November 2000. "Walk Me Home" has sold 2,000 physical copies and 104,000 paid digital downloads according to Nielsen SoundScan.

Music video
The music video for the song was directed by Gregory Dark. Eric Lively plays the part of Moore's romantic interest, whom she meets at a magical movie premiere while traveling through an L.A. airport.

Charts

References

1999 singles
1999 songs
Mandy Moore songs
Music videos directed by Gregory Dark
Songs written by Tony Moran
Epic Records singles
1990s ballads
Pop ballads